The Netherlands was represented by Conny Vandenbos, with the song "'t Is genoeg", at the 1965 Eurovision Song Contest, which took place on 20 March in Naples, Italy. Five acts participated in the Dutch preselection, which consisted of five qualifying rounds, followed by the final on 13 February. All the shows were held at the Theater Concordia in Bussum, hosted by the 1959 Eurovision winner Teddy Scholten. Vandenbos had previously taken part in the Dutch preselection of 1962. Future Dutch representative Ronnie Tober (1968) was one of the other participants.

Before Eurovision

Nationaal Songfestival 1965

Heats
Five qualifying heats took place on consecutive evenings between 8 and 12 February. Each involved one of the selected acts performing three songs, with the jury winner from each act going forward to the final. The 31-member jury contained a mixture of journalists, employees of organising TV station NTS and randomly chosen audience members. The same format was used again in the Dutch preselections of 1966 and 1996.

Final
The national final was held on 13 February. The winning song was again chosen by a mixed 31-member jury, each awarding 1 point to their favourite song. "'t Is genoeg" was the winner by a 5-point margin.

At Eurovision 
On the night of the final Vandenbos performed first in the running order, preceding the United Kingdom. Voting was by each national jury awarding 5-3-1 to its top three songs, and at the close of the voting "'t Is genoeg" had received 5 points (all from Norway), placing the Netherlands 11th of the 18 entries. The Dutch jury awarded its 5 points to contest winners Luxembourg.

The Dutch conductor at the contest was Dolf van der Linden.

Voting

References 

1965
Countries in the Eurovision Song Contest 1965
Eurovision